CDC25 can refer to:

 Cdc25, a cell division cycle protein
 Another name for ras-GRF1, a guanine nucleotide exchange factor